The Howes Building is a historic building located in Clinton, Iowa, United States. The four-story, brick,  Neoclassical structure features arched windows, pilasters, and a chamfered corner.  At one time it had a prominent entrance on the corner that was flanked by columns in the Doric order.  The columns remain in place even though the entrance has been modified. The architect for the first three stories, finished in 1900, was Josiah Rice. The fourth story, finished five years later, was designed by John Morrell.  Both were local architects, Morrell having purchased the Rice firm in 1903. The contractor was John Lake.  Edward M. Howes had the building constructed during a period of population and economic growth in Clinton.  The two upper floors have housed the offices of local professionals. The first and second floors have housed various retail establishments, including Kline's Department Store, Stage Department Store, Jefferson Billiards Shop, Metzger and Cavanaugh Men's Tailors, and the Kaybee Store.  The building has been listed in the National Register of Historic Places since 2004.

References

Commercial buildings completed in 1905
Neoclassical architecture in Iowa
Commercial buildings on the National Register of Historic Places in Iowa
National Register of Historic Places in Clinton County, Iowa
Buildings and structures in Clinton, Iowa
1905 establishments in Iowa